Hostovice is a village and municipality in Snina District of the Prešov Region of north-eastern Slovakia.

History
In historical records the village was first mentioned in 1354.

Geography
The municipality lies at an altitude of 387 metres and covers an area of 29.043 km2. It has a population of about 350 people.

References

External links
 
 
https://web.archive.org/web/20070513023228/http://www.statistics.sk/mosmis/eng/run.html

Villages and municipalities in Snina District